The Alice T. Schafer Mathematics Prize is given annually to an undergraduate woman for excellence in mathematics by the Association for Women in Mathematics (AWM). The prize, which carries a monetary award, is named for former AWM president and founding member Alice T. Schafer; it was first awarded in 1990.

Recipients 
The recipients of the Alice T. Schafer Mathematics Prize are:

 1990: Linda Green, Elizabeth Wilmer
 1991: Jeanne Nielsen
 1992: Zvezdelina E. Stankova
 1993: Catherine O'Neil, Dana Pascovici
 1994: Jing-Rebecca Li
 1995: Ruth Britto-Pacumio
 1996:  Ioana Dumitriu
 1997:  No prize awarded (due to calendar change)
 1998:  Sharon Ann Lozano, Jessica A. Shepherd
 1999:  Caroline Klivans
 2000:  Mariana E. Campbell 
 2001:  Jaclyn (Kohles) Anderson
 2002:  Kay Kirkpatrick, Melanie Wood 
 2003:  Kate Gruher
 2004:  Kimberly Spears
 2005:  Melody Chan
 2006:  Alexandra Ovetsky
 2007:  Ana Caraiani
 2008:  Galyna Dobrovolska, Alison Miller 
 2009:  Maria Monks 
 2010:  Hannah Alpert, Charmaine Sia 
 2011:  Sherry Gong
 2012:  Fan Wei
 2013:  MurphyKate Montee
 2014:  Sarah Peluse
 2015:  Sheela Devadas
 2016:  Mackenzie Simper
 2017:  Hannah Larson
 2018:  Libby Taylor
 2019: Naomi Sweeting
 2020: Natalia Pacheco-Tallaj
 2021: Elena Kim
 2022:  Letong (Carina) Hong
 2023: Faye Jackson

See also

 List of mathematics awards

References

Awards and prizes of the Association for Women in Mathematics